Suriya Juangroongruangkit (born 10 December 1954) is a Thai politician and one of the leaders of the Palang Pracharath Party. From 2002 to 2005, as a member of the Thai Rak Thai party, he was the Minister of Transport of Thailand. , he is Thailand's Minister of Industry.

Background
Born in Bangkok and of Thai Chinese descent, he attended Triam Udom Suksa School, Phaya Thai, and studied at the University of California, Berkeley, where he received a bachelor of science in manufacturing engineering in 1978. After working for various car companies in Thailand, he was appointed transport minister on 3 October 2002. On 11 March 2005 he started his second term in office.

In 2003, Suriya paid US$95,200 for a lucky license plate number for his son's car: 9999.

He is the uncle of Thanathorn Juangroongruangkit.

References

External links
  泰国华裔地位高 出过好几任总理真正的一等公民

Suriya Juangroongruangkit
Suriya Juangroongruangkit
1954 births
Living people
Suriya Juangroongruangkit
Suriya Juangroongruangkit
Suriya Juangroongruangkit
Suriya Juangroongruangkit
Suriya Juangroongruangkit
Suriya Juangroongruangkit